Caroline Herford MBE, later Caroline Herford Blake (1860–1945) was an English educationist.

Life
Caroline Herford was born on 1 November 1860, the daughter of Unitarian minister William Henry Herford and Elizabeth Anne Davis (died 1880). From 1886 to 1907 she was headmistress of the Froebelian Lady Barn House School, which her father had founded in 1873. She also lectured at the Manchester Kindergarten Training College. Caring for her father until his death in 1908, Herford then lectured for a short time at University College, Reading. From 1910 to 1918 she was Lecturer in Education at Manchester University. She was a founding member of the Manchester University branch of the British Federation of University Women, and a member of Manchester City Council until defeated by a Conservative candidate in 1923.

In World War I she was a Red Cross Commandant, organizing university students to meet ambulance trains. For this work she was awarded an MBE in 1919.

In 1924 Herford married Robert Blake (died 1931), and left Manchester to live with him in Somerset. After his death she lived with a Manchester friend, Julia Sharpe, in Great Missenden. She died there on 16 March 1945.

References

1860 births
1945 deaths
Schoolteachers from Greater Manchester
English women educators
Academics of the University of Manchester
Members of the Order of the British Empire